Harold Edwin Stafford (20 April 1921 – 18 January 2005) was a Liberal party member of the House of Commons of Canada. He was born in Fredericton, New Brunswick and became a lawyer by career.

After two defeats at the Elgin riding in the 1962 and 1963 federal elections, Stafford was elected there in the 1965 election and re-elected in 1968. After serving two terms, the 27th and 28th Canadian Parliaments, Stafford was defeated in the 1972 election by John Wise of the Progressive Conservative party.

External links
 

1921 births
2005 deaths
Members of the House of Commons of Canada from Ontario
Liberal Party of Canada MPs
Lawyers in Ontario
Politicians from Fredericton